Maple Hill is a summit located in Central New York Region of New York located in the Town of Webb in Herkimer County, north-northwest of Stillwater Reservoir. Alder Bed Mountain is located southeast of Maple Hill.

References

Mountains of Herkimer County, New York
Mountains of New York (state)